Gert Jonke (8 February 1946  – 4 January 2009) was an Austrian poet, playwright and novelist.

Life
Jonke was born and educated in Klagenfurt, Austria.  He attended the Gymnasium (university preparatory school) and the Conservatory. After he served his mandatory military service, he continued his studies at the College of Music and Representative Art in Vienna in the Film and Television Department.  He did not, however, complete his studies there, nor his studies of History, Philosophy, Music Theory, or German Studies at the University of Vienna which followed.  Despite this, in 1971 he received a scholarship to study in West Berlin, where he stayed for five years.  He then lived for a year in London, followed by extensive travels through the Middle East and South America, after which he settled again in Austria.

Jonke died of cancer at the age of 62 on 4 January 2009, in Vienna.  He was given a grave of honor in the Zentralfriedhof, the central cemetery in Vienna.

Recognition
 1977 Ingeborg Bachmann Prize
 1980 Literature Prize of the University City of Marburg
 1984 Manuscripts prize of Styria
 1987 Austrian Prize for Literature
 1988 Prize of the Frankfurt Authors Foundation
 1990–1993 Robert Musil scholarship
 1991 International Bodensee-Culture Prize
 1993 Merit Award of the City of Vienna
 1994 Anton Wildgans Prize
 1997 Erich Fried Prize
 1997 Franz Kafka Literature Prize of the city of Klosterneuburg
 1998 Berlin Literature Prize
 2001 Grand Austrian State Prize for Literature
 2003 Nestroy Theatre Prize Best Author for Chorphantasie
 2005 Kleist Prize
 2006 Arthur Schnitzler Prize
 2006 Nestroy Theatre Prize Best Author for Die versunkene Kathedrale (The Sunken Cathedral)
 2008 Nestroy Theatre Prize Best Author for Free Fall

Novels (translated into English)
 2000 Geometric Regional Novel (Champaign: Dalkey Archive Press)
 2008 Homage to Czerny: Studies in Virtuoso Technique (Champaign: Dalkey Archive Press)
 2009 Blinding Moment: Four Pieces About Composers (Riverside: Ariadne Press)
 2009 System of Vienna: From Heaven Street to Earth Mound Square (Champaign: Dalkey Archive Press)
 2010 The Distant Sound (Champaign: Dalkey Archive Press) June 2010.
 2012 Awakening to the Great Sleep War (Champaign: Dalkey Archive Press) December 2012.

Theatreplays
 At that time, Graz, Forum Stadtpark Graz 1989
 The Perfidy of the Wind Machines
 Gentle Rage or the Ear Engineer, Theater Sonata, Styriarte Graz 1990
 Opus 111, Volkstheater Vienna 1993
 The Presence of Memory, Volkstheater Vienna 1995
 There sing the Stones, Stadttheater Klagenfurt 1998
 Insektarium, Volkstheater Vienna 1999
 The Birds, UA Volkstheater Wien 2002
 Choir Phantasy, Schauspielhaus Graz, 2003
 Speaker around the Clock, Semper-Depot Vienna, 2004
 Strange Case, Ruhrtriennale, 2005
 The Sunken Cathedral, Burgtheater Vienna 2005
 Gentle Rage or The Ear Engineer, First Performance in Sign Language with the deaf actor Werner Mössler by ARBOS - Company for Music and Theatre Vienna 2006 
 Free Fall, UA Akademietheater Vienna 2008 
 Bursting Suddenly, aktionstheater ensemble at the Festspielhaus Bregenz and Semper Depot Vienna 2008

References

1946 births
2009 deaths
Austrian male dramatists and playwrights
Writers from Klagenfurt
Anton Wildgans Prize winners
Kleist Prize winners
Ingeborg Bachmann Prize winners
Recipients of the Grand Austrian State Prize
20th-century Austrian dramatists and playwrights
20th-century Austrian male writers